The Cranaidae are a family of neotropical harvestmen within the suborder Laniatores.

Name
The name of the type genus is derived from Cranaus, the successor of Cecrops I as king of Attica in Greek mythology.

Description
Body length ranges from about six to sixteen millimeters. The color normally ranges from brown to black greenish, with the legs sometimes lighter to yellowish. Some species feature white stripes on some regions.

Distribution
Most species are found in northern South America, with few species found in Panama and Costa Rica. The diversity of the family is probably explained by the diversity of habitats in the cloud forests of Ecuador and Colombia, ranging from elevations of 500 to 3,500 m. Some species were even collected from elevations as high as 5,000 meters.

Relationships
The four subfamilies constituting the Cranaidae were transferred from Gonyleptidae by Kury (1994), erecting it as a sister group to Cosmetidae and Gonyleptidae. Cranainae and Stygnocranainae are probably closely related.

Subfamilies

See the List of Cranaidae species for a list of currently described species.

 Cranainae — French Guiana, Peru, Ecuador, Colombia, Panama, Brazil, Costa Rica, Trinidad and Venezuela (56 genera, 121 species)
 Heterocranainae — Ecuador, Colombia (1 genus, 2 species)
 Prostygninae — Peru, Ecuador, Venezuela, Colombia (16 genera, 18 species)
 Stygnicranainae — Ecuador, Colombia (3 genera, 6 species)

Footnotes

References
 Joel Hallan's Biology Catalog: Cranaidae
  (1994): The genus Yania and other presumed Tricommatidae from South American highlands (Opiliones, Cranaidae, Prostygninae). Rev. Arachnol. 10: 137-145.
  (eds.) (2007): Harvestmen - The Biology of Opiliones. Harvard University Press .
  (2010) : New familial assignments for three species of Neotropical harvestmen based on cladistic analysis (Arachnida: Opiliones: Laniatores). Zootaxa, 2241: 33–46.
  (2012) : First report of the male of Zamora granulata Roewer, 1928, with implications on the higher taxonomy of the Zamorinae Kury, 1997 (Opiliones, Laniatores, Cranaidae). Zootaxa, 3546: 29–42.

Harvestman families